Mohamed El Moctar is a Malian politician. He serves as the Malian Minister of National Reconciliation.

References

Living people
Government ministers of Mali
Year of birth missing (living people)
21st-century Malian people